Lešnica (Cyrillic: Лешница, meaning "a place of hazels") is a village in western Serbia. It is located in the municipality of Loznica, in the Mačva District. Lešnica's current population is 4,731 (2002 census).

History
The village is one of the oldest in Serbia, with records dating back to the 10th century AD. It is one of a few old settlements there which was not based on a Roman dwelling, but was started by Serbs.

Geography and features
Lešnica is located on the Drina River and between the towns of Šabac and Loznica. The Jadar River also runs through Lešnica. The rivers provide ample fishing opportunities, being rich with carp, barbel, stuka, and zelenjara. The opposite end of the village is bordered by the Vidojevica Mountain, which is relatively low (approx.  above sea level), but its oak and beech forests provide  picturesque beauty. Pheasant hunting is popular, and the hunters' club of the same name maintains the animal populations diligently. Lešnica is part of the Маcva district, close to the Bosnian border. The main attraction is Lešnicas Orthodox church located in the middle of the village.

Economy
The village is an economic and business center to the surrounding villages, and the main street is part of the route from Belgrade to Sarajevo. On Saturday mornings there is a market behind the fire house, where everything can be bought, from farm cheese, eggs, and livestock, to clothing, tools, electronics and Nike shoes. This is not the only opportunity to shop in Lešnica. There are butcheries, grocery shops, fishmongers, bakeries, and many other shops. The bakeries of the village (of which there are many) have a reputation for their excellent pastries, probably a result of the competition between them.

Village center
There is an eighth grade primary school (Petar Tasić), a chestnut wooded park, and many shops, of which the barber shop in the main street is the oldest. In fact, it is the oldest in the country, where the same family of barbers have worked for generations. Across the road from the park and diagonally from the school is the beautiful 19th-century church of St. Peter and Paul. The church was partially destroyed by the Nazis during their occupation, but was rebuilt to provide a spiritual home for the villagers and a magnificent floodlit vista at night. The other side of the park is the location of a late 19th-century manor built by the Pejić family, who were the landlords of the settlement. It belongs to the descendants of the family, but it lies almost in ruin, as it has not been in use since the 1950s, when it was used as school after being confiscated by Communist rulers. There has been recent interest in reviving this once grand building.

See also
List of places in Serbia
Vidin Grad

External links
Varos Lešnica
Lešnica travel guide
Lešnica faces pictures

Populated places in Mačva District
Loznica